The Movement Ecuador's Force (Movimiento Fuerza Ecuador) was a liberal party in Ecuador.

See also
Liberalism
Contributions to liberal theory
Liberalism worldwide
List of liberal parties
Liberal democracy
Liberalism and radicalism in Ecuador

External links
Movement Forwards Ecuador official site

Defunct political parties in Ecuador
Liberal parties in Ecuador